The  is a tilting limited express electric multiple unit (EMU) train type operated by Shikoku Railway Company (JR Shikoku) in Shikoku, Japan, on Ishizuchi limited express services between  and  since June 2014, replacing ageing 2000 series diesel multiple unit trains. A total of 17 vehicles were delivered by February 2018, replacing all diesel units on the route.

Design
The trains are built by Kawasaki Heavy Industries to a "retro-future" concept, with black front ends intended to evoke images of a steam locomotive. The exterior livery includes orange and green highlights evoking the satsuma oranges and olives for which the region is famous. Each vehicle is built at a cost of approximately 250 million yen, financed partially by national infrastructure investment subsidies.

Formations

Three-car sets E1 - E3
The three-car sets, numbered E1 to E3, include "Green" car (first class) accommodation in half of one car, and are formed as follows, with one motored car and two non-powered trailer cars.

The "Tsc" car is fitted with a single-arm pantograph.

Two-car sets E11 - E14

The two-car sets, numbered E11 to E14, are formed with one motored "M" car and one trailer "T" car, as shown below.

Notes

The "Tc" car is fitted with a single-arm pantograph.

Interior
Each seat is provided with an AC power outlet. The "Mc" car has a "Fresh Green" theme with light-green and dark-green seat covers; the "Tc" car has a "Shine Orange" theme, with orange and brown seat covers. The "Tc" car has a wider door for wheelchair accessibility, and includes a wheelchair space and universal access toilet. LED lighting is used throughout.

History

The first two pre-series set, E11 and E12, were delivered to Takamatsu Depot from the Kawasaki Heavy Industries factory in Kobe in February 2014. Test running commenced in March.

The next four full-production sets (three-car sets E1 and E2 and two-car sets E13 and E14) were delivered from Kawasaki Heavy Industries in October 2015.

References

Further reading
 

Electric multiple units of Japan
Tilting trains
Shikoku Railway Company
Train-related introductions in 2014
Kawasaki multiple units
1500 V DC multiple units of Japan